Downtown Carrollton station is a DART Light Rail station in Carrollton, Texas. It serves the DART . This station will serve as an inaugural stop on the Silver Line.

History
The station is at the junction of several rail lines. The Green Line utilizes a segment of the former Missouri–Kansas–Texas Railroad. The Cotton Belt and Burlington Northern Santa Fe lines also crossed here.

The former 1924-built Carrollton Missouri–Kansas–Texas Depot was moved  to accommodate the new light rail line. The DART station opened as part of the Green Line's expansion on December 6, 2010.

References

External links 
Dallas Area Rapid Transit - Downtown Carrollton Station

Dallas Area Rapid Transit light rail stations
Railway stations in the United States opened in 2010
Railway stations in Dallas County, Texas
Dallas Area Rapid Transit commuter rail stations
Former Missouri–Kansas–Texas Railroad stations